Serhiy Andriyovych Chobotenko (born 16 January 1997) is a Ukrainian football centre back.

Career
Chobotenko is product of FC Metalurh Zaporizhya youth team system. His first trainer was Mykola Syenovalov.

He made his debut for FC Mariupol in the Ukrainian Premier League in an away match against FC Zorya Luhansk on 22 July 2018.

References

External links
 
 

1997 births
Living people
Footballers from Zaporizhzhia
Ukrainian footballers
Ukraine youth international footballers
Association football defenders
FC Dynamo Kyiv players
FC Shakhtar Donetsk players
FC Mariupol players
SC Dnipro-1 players
FC Kolos Kovalivka players
Ukrainian Premier League players